Tandanicolidae is a family of trematodes belonging to the order Plagiorchiida.

Genera:
 Buckleytrema Gupta, 1956
 Monodhelmis Dollfus, 1937
 Prosogonarium Yamaguti, 1952
 Tandanicola Johnston, 1927

References

Plagiorchiida